Leucopogon gnaphalioides is a species of flowering plant in the heath family Ericaceae and is endemic to the south-west of Western Australia. It is a slender or sprawling shrub with crowded egg-shaped to lance-shaped leaves and spikes of tube-shaped white flowers on the ends of branches and in upper leaf axils.

Description
The flowers are arranged in short, dense spikes on the ends of branches or in upper leaf axils with bracts and bracteoles about half as long as the sepals.

Taxonomy
Leucopogon gnaphalioides was first formally described in 1859 by Sergei Sergeyevich Sheglejev in the Bulletin de la Société impériale des naturalistes de Moscou from specimens collected by James Drummond. The specific epithet (gnaphalioides) means "Gnaphalium-like.

Distribution and habitat
This leucopogon grows in shallow, rocky soils on rocky slopes and plateaus in the Esperance Plains and Mallee bioregions of south-western Western Australia.

Conservation statusLeucopogon gnaphalioides'' is listed as "Threatened" by the Western Australian Government Department of Biodiversity, Conservation and Attractions, meaning that it is in danger of extinction.

References

gnaphalioides
Ericales of Australia
Flora of Western Australia
Plants described in 1859